The fourth election to Western Isles Council was held on 8 May 1986 as part of the wider 1986 Scottish regional elections.

The election was the first Western Isles council election to be contested by a political party, with the Scottish Labour Party putting up a single candidate in the Northbay ward. The Labour candidate was unsuccessful, gaining 5.2% of the vote in the ward.

Aggregate results

Ward results

References

1986 Scottish local elections
1986